Glasgow Scotstoun was a burgh constituency of the House of Commons of the Parliament of the United Kingdom from 1950 until 1974. It elected one Member of Parliament (MP) using the first-past-the-post voting system.

Boundaries

The Representation of the People Act 1948 provided that the constituency was to consist of "The following wards (as so constituted) of the county of the city of Glasgow, namely, Knightswood, Whiteinch and Yoker."

The Parliamentary Constituencies (Scotland) (Glasgow Scotstoun, Glasgow Hillhead and Glasgow Woodside) Order, 1955 redefined the constituency as consisting of "The following wards of the county of the city of Glasgow, namely, Knightswood, Yoker and that part of Whiteinch ward which is not included in the Hillhead constituency."

Glasgow Scotstoun's boundaries were very similar to the post-2005 Glasgow North West Westminster constituency and the post-2011 Glasgow Anniesland Holyrood constituency.

Members of Parliament

Election results

Elections in the 1950s

Elections in the 1960s

Elections in the 1970s

References

Historic parliamentary constituencies in Scotland (Westminster)
Constituencies of the Parliament of the United Kingdom established in 1950
Constituencies of the Parliament of the United Kingdom disestablished in 1974
Politics of Glasgow
Drumchapel